Excelsior Amusement Park was an amusement park on Lake Minnetonka in the town of Excelsior, Minnesota, United States. The park, which operated from 1925 to 1973, was a popular destination for company picnics and day trips from the Twin Cities.

Attractions
Inspired by Coney Island, the park's main attractions included a wooden roller coaster called the Cyclone, a Ferris wheel, bumper cars, boat rides, a fun house, and a carousel. The fun house had a gunny sack slide, a spinning disc that hurled people into a padded sidewall and a turning barrel that was nearly impossible to walk through. The carousel, built by the Philadelphia Toboggan Company, was in service for the entire duration of the park and is still in use at Valleyfair Amusement Park in Shakopee. A second ride, the Scrambler, was also saved from destruction.  Contrary to widespread belief, the Cyclone roller coaster was not relocated to Valleyfair and renamed High Roller. The Cyclone was scrapped, and High Roller was designed especially for the new park.

History
Excelsior Amusement Park opened in 1925 and was run by Fred W. Pearce, an established amusement park operator and roller coaster builder. A streetcar line from Minneapolis brought guests to the park from Memorial Day through Labor Day until the line was closed in 1932.

Excelsior Amusement Park was very popular in the 1940s and 1950s. During the 1960s the park became a hangout for Excelsior teens and attracted crowds of young people from around the Twin Cities.  Several incidents occurred in the late 1960s, some with racial overtones, and the trouble contributed to the park's eventual decline.

Danceland Ballroom at Excelsior Amusement Park hosted many well-known musical acts, including Lawrence Welk, Tommy Dorsey, the Beach Boys and the Rolling Stones. Legend has it that a visit by the Rolling Stones in June 1964 inspired the lyrics to the song You Can't Always Get What You Want.  A chance meeting between Mick Jagger and local character "Mr. Jimmy" (Jimmy Hutmaker) gave rise to the story, which has never been verified.

Excelsior Amusement Park closed in 1973 and was demolished soon thereafter. The park's owners then purchased land in Scott County for a new venue. Valleyfair, which opened in Shakopee in 1976, now serves as the Twin Cities' primary amusement park. The former amusement park site is today the home of condominiums and Maynard's Restaurant of Excelsior.

See also
Big Island Amusement Park on Lake Minnetonka
Trolley park

References

External links

Jimmy Hutmaker profile
Amusement parks of the Twin Cities
Excelsior Amusement Park Primary Source Set - Minnesota Digital Library

Photos
Excelsior Amusement Park at the Minnesota Historical Society.
Excelsior Amusement Park at the Excelsior - Lake Minnetonka Historical Society.
Lake Minnetonka History
Excelsior Amusement Park
Big Reggie's Danceland
The Rolling Stones come to Danceland

Amusement parks in Minnesota
Philadelphia Toboggan Coasters carousels
1925 establishments in Minnesota
1973 disestablishments in Minnesota
Defunct amusement parks in Minnesota